Scandium sulfate is the scandium salt of sulfuric acid and has the formula Sc2(SO4)3.

References

Scandium compounds
Sulfates
Inorganic compounds